The Loft Live was a weekly live variety hour television program produced by RMITV that broadcast on C31 Melbourne. The cast included Rove McManus (1997-1999), Scott Brennan, Peter Helliar, Adam Richard, Myf Warhurst, Ged Wood, Bert Kennedy, Kim Hope, Matilda Donaldson, Bernie Carr and special reporters . Like its predecessor Under Melbourne Tonight, The Loft Live provided a platform for up and coming talent airtime and gained a following between 50,000-100,000 viewers a week.

Guests
Guests on the show included Larry Emdur, Livinia Nixon, John Brumby, Nadine Garner, Judith Lucy Jeremy Sims, Neville Stonehouse, Dylan Lewis, Francis Leach, John Safran, Edwin Maher

Cast

John Safran
In 2004, John Safran vs God Episode 1 featured footage from The Loft Live. John Safran vs God Episode 1 follows the plot that John Safran had appeared on The Loft Live with Rove McManus in 1997 after gaining popularity on the ABC TV show Race Around the World. After the taping of the episode of The Loft, Rove promised Safran that "If I ever can do anything for you ever, just ask". Five years later, in 2002, Safran's career had taken a beating after termination of his pilot commissioned by the ABC for an altercation he had with Ray Martin during the filming John Safran: Media Tycoon. By this stage, Rove was already at the top of Australian TV. Wanting to gain publicity for his new SBS show John Safran's Music Jamboree, according to Safran , the SBS publicist had tentatively booked him in as a guest on Rove Live. Before the Taping of Rove Live, American singer P!nk replaced Safran as the guest. In 2004, Safran took a trip to the UK to jokingly get a Fatwa put upon Rove by Omar Bakri Muhammad. The fatwa was later taken off when Omar Bakri was told by Safran that the pictures showing McManus mocking Islam were falsified. Safran later appeared on Rove in 2009 and thanked McManus for having him on despite the Fatwa incident.

References

Television shows set in Victoria (Australia)
Australian community access television shows
English-language television shows
1997 Australian television series debuts
2000 Australian television series endings
RMITV productions